Marc Brault is a former Canadian diplomat. He was Ambassador Extraordinary and Plenipotentiary to Egypt followed by South Africa then concurrently High Commissioner to Swaziland and Lesotho then to Namibia.

External links 
 Foreign Affairs and International Trade Canada Complete List of Posts

Year of birth missing (living people)
Living people
High Commissioners of Canada to Namibia
High Commissioners of Canada to Lesotho
High Commissioners of Canada to Eswatini
Ambassadors of Canada to South Africa
Ambassadors of Canada to Egypt